Steve Scott (born 1951) is a poet, spoken word artist, and musician.  His written work was published by PRIZM Magazine, Radix Magazine, Monolith:UK publications and STRIDE UK publications. His music was released on labels such as Exit Records (A&M Records) and Blonde Vinyl.

Among other artists, he has worked with the 77s, Love Coma, Randy Stonehill, Steven Soles and Charlie Peacock. Conference and festival appearances include Cornerstone Festival, Greenbelt Festival, L'Abri Fellowship in England, Biola University, Bali Arts Conference, and Calvary Chapel Pastor's conference. He has toured in the Netherlands, Russia, the United Kingdom and the United States.

In the 1990s, Scott produced Crossing the Boundaries in collaboration with artist Gaylen Stewart. The multimedia presentation has toured the United States.

In September 2017, Steve announced the release of a new album "Cross My Heat", recorded over a period of eight years.

Discography

Contributions

Publications

Books

Notes

References 
 
 
 
  Issue #5.

External links 
 
 
 
 
 
 
 
 CANA (Christian Artists Networking Association) Steve Scott is the association's American contact.

1951 births
Living people
British performers of Christian music
Musicians from London
Spoken word poets
Writers from London